Ekeby was a locality situated in Upplands Väsby Municipality, Stockholm County, Sweden with 258 inhabitants in 2010.

References 

Populated places in Upplands Väsby Municipality